Opheylissem Castle is a large stately home in Opheylissem in the municipality of Hélécine, Walloon Brabant, Wallonia, Belgium.

The present building represents the remains of the former Premonstratensian Opheylissem Abbey, which was dissolved in 1796. Most of the buildings were destroyed, but the abbot's house (prelatuur) remained, and in 1870 was restructured by the architect Alphonse Balat in its present form. Balat laid out the surrounding park at the same time.

The house and park were acquired by the Province of Brabant, and after 1995 became that of the Province of Walloon Brabant.

See also
List of castles in Belgium

External links
Domaine provincial d'Hélécine, Tourist office province of Brabant wallon

Parks in Belgium
Castles in Belgium
Castles in Walloon Brabant
Hélécine